West Pasco is a census-designated place (CDP) in Franklin County, Washington, United States. The population was 3,739 at the 2010 census.

Based on per capita income, one of the more reliable measures of affluence, West Pasco ranks 47th of 522 areas in the state of Washington to be ranked. It is also the highest rank achieved in Franklin County. The city of Pasco, Washington, as of 2012, was attempting to annex all of West Pasco, although there was some resistance.

Geography 
West Pasco is located in southern Franklin County at  (46.252607, -119.182730). It is entirely surrounded by the city of Pasco.

Demographics 

As of the census of 2000, there were 4,629 people, 1,618 households, and 1,380 families residing in the CDP. The population density was 767.8 people per square mile (296.4/km). There were 1,661 housing units at an average density of 275.5/sq mi (106.4/km). The racial makeup of the CDP was 89.59% White, 1.10% African American, 0.73% Native American, 1.17% Asian, 0.04% Pacific Islander, 4.47% from other races, and 2.89% from two or more races. Hispanic or Latino of any race were 10.02% of the population.

There were 1,618 households, out of which 35.8% had children under the age of 18 living with them, 76.8% were married couples living together, 4.9% had a female householder with no husband present, and 14.7% were non-families. 12.2% of all households were made up of individuals, and 5.3% had someone living alone who was 65 years of age or older. The average household size was 2.85 and the average family size was 3.08.

In the CDP, the age distribution of the population shows 26.6% under the age of 18, 6.0% from 18 to 24, 24.2% from 25 to 44, 31.1% from 45 to 64, and 12.1% who were 65 years of age or older. The median age was 42 years. For every 100 females, there were 99.5 males. For every 100 females age 18 and over, there were 99.5 males.

The median income for a household in the CDP was $65,865, and the median income for a family was $68,205. Males had a median income of $50,504 versus $31,947 for females. The per capita income for the CDP was $28,523. About 2.2% of families and 2.8% of the population were below the poverty line, including 4.0% of those under age 18 and 2.1% of those age 65 or over.

References 

Census-designated places in Franklin County, Washington
Census-designated places in Washington (state)
Tri-Cities, Washington